Mountjoy may refer to:

Places
 Brockagh (also known as Mountjoy), a hamlet in County Tyrone in Northern Ireland
 Mountjoy, Ontario, a neighbourhood in Timmins, Ontario, Canada
 Mountjoy Castle, a castle in Magheralamfield, County Tyrone, Northern Ireland
 Mountjoy Prison, a medium security prison in Dublin, Ireland opened in 1850
 Mountjoy Square, a city square in Dublin
 Mountjoy, a former barony of Ireland now known as Dungannon Upper
 Mountjoy, the hill roughly 4 kilometers (2.5 miles) north of Jerusalem where the army of the First Crusade rejoiced upon getting their first glimpse of Jerusalem in June of 1099

People

Title
 Baron Mountjoy, a hereditary title given to the men of two families
 William Blount, 4th Baron Mountjoy (died 1534)
 Charles Blount, 5th Baron Mountjoy (1516–1544)
 Charles Blount, 1st Earl of Devonshire, Lord Mountjoy, Lord Deputy of Ireland

Surname
 Celeste Mountjoy, Australian artist and illustrator
Dick Mountjoy (1932–2015), American politician from California
 Doug Mountjoy (1942–2021), Welsh Snooker player
 Eric W. Mountjoy (1931–2010), Canadian emeritus professor at McGill University
 Penelope Mountjoy, archaeologist

Given name
 Mountjoy Blount, 1st Earl of Newport (c. 1563–1606), illegitimate son of Charles Blount, 1st Earl of Devonshire

Fictional
 Mountjoy (comics), a mutant in the Marvel Comics Universe
 Mountjoy, the French herald in Shakespeare's Henry V

Ships
 The Mountjoy was a merchant ship used to relieve the Siege of derry in Ulster in 1689. It was also the codename for the ship used in the 1914 Larne Gun Running.

See also

 Mount Joy (disambiguation)
 Montjoi (disambiguation)
 Montjoie (disambiguation)